Anton Schlembach (7 February 1932 – 15 June 2020) was a German Roman Catholic clergyman who served as the 95th Bishop of Speyer.

Childhood and education
Anton Schlembach was born in Großwenkheim near Münnerstadt, Unterfranken in the archdiocese of Würzburg, the oldest of four children in a farmer's family. After graduating in 1950, from the Humanist Gymnasium in Miltenberg, he studied Catholic theology at the University of Würzburg and at the Papal University in Rome. He was ordained as a priest of Würzburg on 10 October 1956 with Cardinal Franz König. In 1959 he was awarded doctorate of theology. In 1981 he became vicar general in Würzburg.

As Bishop of Speyer
On 25 August 1983 Pope John Paul II named him the successor to bishop Friedrich Wetter. He ascended to the office on 16 October 1983 in the Speyer cathedral, consecrated by his predecessor Friedrich Wetter, Archbishop of Munich.

Pope Benedict XVI agreed to his retirement, effective 10 February 2007.

Schlembach died 15 June 2020, aged 88.

Writings
 Anton Schlembach, Waltraud Herbstrith: Erinnere dich – vergiss es nicht: Edith Stein – christlich-jüdische Perspektiven; Plöger Medien, 1986; 
 Anton Schlembach, Karlheinz Debus: Robert Schuman. Lothringer – Europäer – Christ; Speyer: Pilger-Verlag, .
 Anton Schlembach, Dienst unter sechs Päpsten; in: Bernhard Oswald (Hrsg.): Lebenswege. Miltenberger Abiturienten 1950; Miltenberg 2007; 
 Anton Schlembach: Zeugen des Glaubens. Predigten und Beiträge aus 24 Bischofsjahren. Festgabe zum 75. Geburtstag von Bischof Dr. Anton Schlembach; Speyer: Pilger-Verlag, 2007;

References

                   

1932 births
2020 deaths
People from Bad Kissingen (district)
Roman Catholic bishops of Speyer
20th-century German Roman Catholic bishops
21st-century German Roman Catholic bishops
20th-century German Roman Catholic priests